Martiny is a surname. Notable people with the surname include: 

Constant Martiny (1888–1942), Belgian intelligence agent
Danny Martiny (born 1951), American politician and attorney
Donald Martiny (born 1953), American artist
Erik Martiny (born 1971), Franco-Irish-Swedish novelist, academic and journalist 
Jennifer Martiny, American ecologist
Marie Deluil-Martiny (1841–1884), French nun
Philip Martiny (1858–1927), Franco-American sculptor